Gaysky (masculine), Gayskaya (feminine), or Gayskoye (neuter) may refer to:
Gaysky District, a district of Orenburg Oblast, Russia
Gaysky Urban Okrug, a municipal formation in Orenburg Oblast, Russia